James McCosh (April 1, 1811 – November 16, 1894) was a philosopher of the Scottish School of Common Sense. He was president of Princeton University 1868–88.

Biography

McCosh was born into a Covenanting family in Ayrshire, and studied at the Universities of Glasgow and Edinburgh, obtaining his M.A. at the latter, at the suggestion of Sir William Hamilton, for an essay on stoicism. He became a minister of the Church of Scotland in 1834, serving as minister first at Abbey Church in Arbroath and then at Brechin.  He sided with the Free Church of Scotland in the Disruption of 1843, becoming minister at Brechin's new East Free Church. In 1850 or 1851 he was appointed Professor of Logic and Metaphysics at Queen's College, Belfast (now Queen's University Belfast).

In 1868 he travelled to the United States to become president of the College of New Jersey (now Princeton University). He resigned the presidency in 1888, but continued to teach philosophy until his death. McCosh Hall (home of the English department) and a cross-campus walkway are named in his honor. The campus infirmary is named after his wife, Isabella McCosh. A school on the South Side of Chicago was named after him, but has since been renamed the Emmett Louis Till Math & Science Academy.

He was immortalised  by  William Makepeace Thackeray  in  the ballad  of  "The  Last  Irish  Grievance".

Philosophical work
McCosh's position was mainly in the tradition of Thomas Reid and other Scottish common-sense philosophers.  He denied that our beliefs about the nature of the external world rest on causal or other inferences from perceptual ideas, but held that they are the direct accompaniments of sensation, and thus not open to question.  He also argued for the a priori nature of fundamental principles such as those of causality and morality.   Our judgements and other cognitions are regulated by such principles, though that is not to say that everyone is aware of them; they can be reached through reflection on our experience, when they are recognised as self-evidently necessary. In his moral theory, especially, McCosh differed from many of his contemporaries in being relatively uninfluenced by Kant.

Evolution
McCosh's most original work concerned the attempt to reconcile evolution and Christianity. In 1874, Charles Hodge, the theologian and intellectual leader at the Presbyterian Seminary in Princeton,  published What is Darwinism?, claiming that Darwinism, was, in essence, atheism. To Hodge, Darwinism was contrary to the notion of design and was therefore clearly atheistic. Hodge's views determined the position of the Seminary until his death in 1878. Hodge simply refused to accept that natural laws alone could create complex organisms that fit into their niches so perfectly and that evolution could explain origins. While he didn't consider all evolutionary ideas to be in conflict with his religion, he was concerned with its teaching in colleges. Meanwhile at the college across town (a totally separate institution) President John Maclean also rejected Darwin's theory of evolution. However in 1868, McCosh became president at the college. McCosh realized that much of Darwinism could and would be proved sound, and so he strove to prepare Christians for this event. Instead of conflict between science and religion, McCosh sought reconciliation. Insisting on the principle of design in nature, McCosh interpreted the Darwinian discoveries as more evidence of the prearrangement, skill, and purpose in the universe. He thus demonstrated that Darwinism was not atheistic nor in irreconcilable hostility to the Bible. McCosh thus argued that evolution, far from being inconsistent with belief in divine design, glorifies the divine designer (see for example his Christianity and Positivism), believing nature was entirely interconnected by natural laws God was immanent with. This aspect of his work found popularity among most Presbyterian clergy, who found his arguments useful in their attempts to cope with scientific philosophy.  The Presbyterians in America thus could choose between two schools of thought on evolution, both based in Princeton. The Seminary held to Hodge's position until his supporters were ousted in 1929, and the college (Princeton University) became a world class center of the new science of evolutionary biology.

The debate between McCosh as president of the college and Charles Hodge, head of Princeton Seminary, during the late 1860s and 1870s exemplified the classic conflict between science and religion over the question of Darwin's evolution theory. McCosh offered the first public endorsement of evolution by an American religious leader. However, the two men showed greater similarities regarding matters of science and religion than popularly appreciated. Both supported the increasing role of scientific inquiry in natural history and resisted its intrusion into philosophy and religion. The debate vitalized the college.

He was elected as a member to the American Philosophical Society in 1871.

Works
The  Wheat and  the  Chaff  gathered  into  Bundles:  a Statistical  Contribution  towards  the  History of  the  Recent  Disruption  of  the Scottish Ecclesiastical  Establishment  (Perth,  1843)
Does  the  Established  Church  acknowledge Christ  as  its  Head  ?  (Brechin,  1846)
A Tribute  to  the  Memory  of  Dr  Chalmers, by  a  Former  Pupil  (Brechin,  1847)
The Method  of  the  Divine  Government,  Physical and  Moral  (Edinburgh,  1850,  last  ed., New  York,  1874)
The  Ulster  Revival and  its  Physiological  Accidents  (Belfast) [1859]
The  Intuitions  of  the  Mind  Inductively Investigated  (London,  1860,  1865 ; New  York,  1872)
The  Supernatural  in relation  to  the  Natural  (Cambridge,  Belfast, and    New    York,    1862)
Supplement    to Dugald  Stewart's  "Outlines  of  Moral  Philosophy" (1865)
An  Examination  of  Mr  J. S.  Mill's  Philosophy,  being  a  Defence  of Fundamental  Truth  (London,  1866  and 1886;  New  York,  1875  and 1880)
Philosophical Papers — I.,  Examination  of  Sir William  Hamilton's  Logic ;  II.,  Reply  to Mr  Mill's  Third  Edition ;  III.,  Present State  of  Moral  Philosophy  in  Britain (London,  1868;  New  York,  1869)
The Laws  of  Discursive  Thought  (London  and New  York,  1870-90)
Christianity  and Positivism :  a  Series  of  Lectures  on  Natural Theology  and  Apologetics  (London  and  New York,  1871-5)
The  Scottish  Philosophy: Biographical,  Expository,  Critical,  from Hutcheson  to  Hamilton  (London,  1874 ; New  York,  1880)
Ideas  in  Nature  overlooked by  Dr  Tyndall  (New  York,  1875)
The  Development  Hypothesis :  is  it  sufficient? (New  York,  1876)
The  Emotions  (London and  New  York,  1880)
The  Conflicts  of the  Age  (New  York,  1881)
Psychology: the  Motive  Powers — Emotions,  Conscience, Will  (London  and  New  York,  1887)
Realistic  Philosophy  Defended  in  a  Philosophic Series  (London  and  New  York, 1887)
The  Religious  Aspect  of  Evolution, the  Bedell  Lectures  for  1887  (New  York, 1888-90)
First  and  Fundamental  Truths (London  and  New  York,  1889)
Psychology  : the  Cognitive  Powers  (London  and  New York,  1889-91)
The  Tests  of  Various  Kinds of  Truths  (Merrick  Lectures)  (New  York  and Cincinnati,  1889-91)
The  Prevailing  Types of  Philosophy  :  can  they  reach  Reality  logically? (New  York,  1890)
Our  Moral  Nature (New  York,  1892)
[jointly  with  Dr  George Dickie]  Typical  Forms  and  Special  Ends  in Creation  (Edinburgh,  1855  ;  London,  1862  ; New  York,  1880)]
and  a  very  large  number of  contributions  to  periodical  literature.

For a complete list of his writings see Joseph Heatly Dulles, McCosh Bibliography (Princeton, 1895).

Main works
The Method of Divine Government, Physical and Moral (Edinburgh, 1850, 5th ed., 1856, and frequently republished in New York)
The Typical Forms and Special Ends in Creation (Edinburgh, 1855; New York, 1856)
Intuitions of the Mind Inductively Investigated (London and New York, 1860; 3rd rev. ed., 1872)
An Examination of Mr J. S. Mill's Philosophy (London and New York, 1866; enlarged 1871, several editions)
Dr. McCosh's Logic: Laws of Discursive Thought, Being a Text-Book of Formal Logic (Robert Carter & Brothers, 1885)
Philosophical Papers containing (1)"Examination of Sir W. Hamilton's Logic", (2)"Reply to Mr Mill's third edition", and (3) "Present State of Moral Philosophy in Britain".
First and Fundamental Truths: Being a Treatise on Metaphysics (New York, Charles Scribner's Sons, 1889)
The Religious Aspect of Evolution (New York, 1888, 2nd ed., 1890).

Family
He  married  29  September  1845,  Isabella (died  12  November  1909),  daughter  of  Alexander  Guthrie,  surgeon,  Brechin,  and  had  issue  —
Mary  Jane,  born  5  July  1846
Andrew,  born  15  April  1848,  died  15  October  1849
Alexander  Guthrie,  born  16  January  1850
Margaret  Sarah,  born  21  June  1852
Andrew  James,  born  15  March  1858.

References

Citations

Sources

 
 Douglas Arner, "James McCosh", in The Encyclopedia of Philosophy", ed. Paul Edwards (Collier Macmillan, 1967)

 Paul Helm, "M'Cosh, James", in Dictionary of Scottish Church History and Theology, ed. Nigel M de S Cameron (Edinburgh, T & T Clark, 1993)

 Hoeveler, J. David, Jr. James McCosh and the Scottish Intellectual Tradition: From Glasgow to Princeton. (1981). 374 pp.

 

Further reading

 Hoeveler, J. David (1981), James McCosh and the Scottish Intellectual Tradition'', Princeton University Press, 

   

1811 births
1894 deaths
Scottish philosophers
Presidents of Princeton University
Academics of Queen's University Belfast
19th-century British philosophers
People from Ayrshire
Alumni of the University of Glasgow
Alumni of the University of Edinburgh
Theistic evolutionists
Scottish emigrants to the United States
19th-century Ministers of the Free Church of Scotland